Julianus Marie August De Boeck (May 9, 1865 in Merchtem, Belgium – October 9, 1937 in Merchtem) was a Flemish composer, organist and music pedagogue. He was the son of organist and director Florentinus (Flor) De Boeck (1826-1892)

Career 
From 1880 he studied organ at the Royal Conservatory of Brussels under Alphonse Mailly, whose assistant he became until 1902.
In 1889 he met the young Paul Gilson who became a close friend and, despite being the same age, his teacher for orchestration. Gilson encouraged De Boeck's composition work.

He became an organist at various churches in Belgian villages (1892-1894 in Merchtem, 1894-1920 in Elsene).  His academic career continued in 1907 as professor of harmony at the Royal Conservatory of Antwerp (1909–1920) and the Brussels Conservatory, and as director of the Conservatory of Mechelen (1921–1930). His students included Maria Scheepers. In 1930 August De Boeck retired to his birthplace, Merchtem.

As with Gilson, De Boeck's style was influenced by the Russian Five, and especially Nikolai Rimsky-Korsakov. Along with Gilson, he introduced impressionist composition in Belgium. He wrote about 400 compositions including vocal work, operas, religious pieces and instrumental compositions.

Honours 
 1934 : Commander in the Order of Leopold.
 Member of the Royal Academy of Science, Letters and Fine Arts of Belgium

Works

Orchestral works 

 1893 Rhapsodie Dahoméenne
 1895 Symphony in G
 1923 Fantasy on two Flemish folk tunes
 1926 Fantasy for oboe and orchestra
 1929 Concerto for violin and orchestra
 1929 Concerto for Hans piano and orchestra (with Maria Scheepers)
 1931 Nocturne
 1932 Concerto for piano and orchestra
 1936 Cantilène for cello and chamber orchestra
 1937 In schuur
 Cinderella, symphonic poem
 Elegy for string orchestra
 Gavotte for string orchestra

Sacred works 

 Three Masses, for three voices and organ
 17 Spiritual Songs
 1898 Trois Pièces, for organ
1. Prélude
2. Andante
3. Allegretto
 Allegro con fuoco, for organ
 Marche Nuptiale, for organ

Secular vocal works 

Songs: 54 on Flemish texts; 45 on French texts; 57 children's songs
 , for mezzo and piano
 , four songs for mezzo and piano
 , for baritone and orchestra
 , for soprano and orchestra (after a text of G. J. P. van Straaten)
 , for baritone and orchestra
  for baritone and orchestra
 , for mezzo and orchestra
 Six songs after poems of Jeanne Cuisinier, for mezzo and piano
 , for baritone and orchestra
 , six songs for mezzo and orchestra
 Two songs after poems of Charles van Lerberghe, for mezzo and piano
 12 Cantatas
 for chorus and orchestra
 38 Motets

Operas and stage works 

 1901 Théroigne de Méricourt, Singspiel in two acts - libretto: Léonce du Catillon
 1903 Winternachtsdroom, Singspiel in one act - libretto: Léonce du Catillon
 1906 De Rijndwergen, musical fairy tale in three acts - libretto: Pol de Mont
 1909 Reinaert de Vos, opera, in three acts - libretto: Raf Verhulst
 1918 Papa Poliet, operette - libretto: Jan Vanderlee
 1921 La Route d'Emeraude, lyric opera in four acts - libretto: Max Hautier naar het gelijknamig roman van Eugène Demolder
 1929 Totole, operette - libretto: A. V. Lions

Ballets 

 1895 Cendrillon
 1896 La Phalène

Incidental music 

 1894 La Chevalière d’Eon (G. Eekhoud)
 1909 Jesus de Nazarener (R. Verhulst)

Chamber music 

 50 Compositions for piano
Nocturne, for piano solo
 19 Works for piano and solo instrument
 Sonata, for cello and piano (1894)
 Cantilene, for cello and piano
 Fantasia in G minor for viola and piano (1916)
 Fantasie, for trombone and piano (1931)

Works for fanfare 

 1893 Rapsodie dahoméenne
 1896 Symfonische Suite uit "La Phalène" - "De Nachtvlinder"
 1902 Fantaisie
 1912 Jubelmars - Marche Jubilaire
 1929 Excelsior
 1934 Geuze Lambik
 1935 Vrijheidsgeest
 Pasquinade
 Marche Nuptiale
 Marche Solennelle
 Ave
 Bever en zoom
 Dyones
 Fanfare
 Impromptu
 Kapperpolka
 Oomken
 Pan
 Siskioo
 Scherzando
 Wozonmarch
 Floria patri
 Panache
 Soetendael
 Supermarch
 Snip - Snap
 Triplex
 Wals
 Plechtige Stoet

Sources
 

Specific

External links 
 Koninklijk Conservatorium Brussel now houses most works and manuscripts of De Boeck, after the bankruptcy of CeBeDeM in 2015.
 
 

1865 births
1937 deaths
19th-century Belgian male musicians
20th-century classical composers
20th-century Belgian male musicians
Belgian classical composers
Belgian male classical composers
Members of the Royal Academy of Belgium
People from Merchtem
Romantic composers